Sewu, Sêwa or Sewuxiang is a village and township-level division of Amdo County in the Nagqu Prefecture of the Tibet Autonomous Region, in China. It lies near Qixiang Lake. The principal economic activity is animal husbandry, pastoral yak, goat, sheep, and so on.

Administrative divisions
The township-level division contains the following villages:

Meijiegang Village (美接岗村) 	
Sangguo Village	 (桑果村) 
Bamu Luozong Village	(巴姆罗宗村) 	
Mamao Xuna Village (玛毛许那村)

See also
List of towns and villages in Tibet

References

Township-level divisions of Tibet
Populated places in Nagqu